Wellington is an unincorporated community in Gogebic County, in the U.S. state of Michigan.

History
The community was named for C. L. Wellington, a railroad official.

References

Unincorporated communities in Gogebic County, Michigan